The third gendered in Sri Lanka are not as openly discussed as in other parts of South Asia. Though a strong tradition of transgender people exists in Sri Lanka, and even though these people have been allowed to convert for a long period of time, third gendered people have mostly avoided mainstream discussion on the island. A number of reports state that the concept of third gender is not found on island, but binary concepts are found that are similar to third gender.

History

Hinduism 
The concept of gender changing is very common within historic and ancient Indian culture, and distinction between biological sex and cultural gender was not made. Sri Lanka's third gendered "hold an ancient association with a Hindu goddess of fertility to which they are said to sacrifice their own fertility for the sake of others. By becoming eunuchs, Hijras become semi-sacred, and can bless the health and fertility of newlyweds and newborns."

The Tamils of the Northern Province have a culture of cross-dressing, "so [a male] being feminine isn’t an entirely alien concept".

Buddhism 
The term 'pandaka' can be used to trace the history of third gender back to the awakening of the Buddha and the arrival of Buddhism to Sri Lanka over two millennia ago. Buddhaghosa, a monk in Anurādhapura, Sri Lanka, wrote about pandaka; they "are full of defiling passions (ussanakilesa); their lusts are unquenchable (avupasantaparilaha); and they are dominated by their libido (parilahavegabhibhuta) and the desire for lovers just like prostitutes (vesiya) and coarse young girls (thulakumarika)". He also stated that they are “whose sexual burning is assuaged by taking another man’s member in his mouth and being sprayed by semen” and usuya (“jealous”) pandakas as those “whose sexual burning is assuaged by watching other people having sex”.

The Pali Tipitaka, the form of Buddhism followed in Thailand and Sri Lanka, and the most complete transmission being held custodian in Sri Lanka, "mentions several different types of transgendered states and individuals – the man-like woman (vepurisikā), sexual indistinctness (sambhinna), one having the characteristics of both genders (ubhatovyañjanaka), etc.".

Peter Jackson of the Australian National University felt that the Pali Canon had significant influence on the third gender cultures of Sri Lanka and similar countries such as Thailand; ", what makes accounts of sex and gender in these ancient Indian texts especially fascinating is their contemporary relevance in Thailand, which together with Sri Lanka, Burma, Laos and Cambodia forms part of the Asian cultural sphere in which Therava da Buddhism remains a vital cultural institution.".

Culture 
They are employed in variety of job sectors, especially in "commercial  sex  work,  beauty culture,  Hospitality  field,  NGO  sector  and  limited  numbers in the government sector".

Etymology 
The term 'nachchi' is widely used to refer to transgender people, while napunseka can be used to imply a third gendered centric view of transexuals. The term 'Hijra' can also be used to refer to the third gendered community on the island.

Pandaka 
The term 'pandaka' has two meaning in Indian languages. The first refers to 'eunuchs' and is of Tamil origin. The second refers to homosexual men and is academically considered to be a form of slang.

Nachchi 
Nachchis are described as being a variety of people that do not conform to hetereosexual male stereotypes. It was historically used to describe cross-dressers but now is mostly used to describe transgender people.

A few organizations such as the National Aids Council describe the community as being "effeminate men who have sex with other men. They also operate as MSWs, and pick up clients from various cruising points. In addition to having clients, they often have regular male sex partners, with whom sexual activity takes place without financial transactions." It is debatable what this refers to however as there is no clean definition provided

Other organizations describe them as being a subculture of the transgender community, often as a substitute for the terms such as third gender or hijra.

Pons

Napunseka 
A term found in Sinhalese that was historically used in a similar manner to nachchi, but now either refers to eunuchs or hermaphrodites.

Hijra

Politics 
The situation in the Constitution of Sri Lanka is the same as the one found in the Constitution of India concerning gender equality, though the Supreme Court of Sri Lanka lacks the powers to repel and create law in the same manner that the Supreme Court of India has.

Human Rights Watch stated that third gendered people were not protected by the legal system of Sri Lanka. It called on the parliament to decriminalize being third gender by repelling three laws; Sections 365 and 365A of the Sri Lankan Penal Code, and the Vagrants’ Ordinance. It also recommended that the government passes comprehensive laws to fight discrimination.

LGBT rights activists have focused on improving conditions for transgender people who wish to convert to another binary gender, as opposed to the progression in Continental India, where the movement has focused on the third gendered community. There is apathy among sexual minorities on the island over third gendered rights because they feel it would slow down progression for other minority communities on the island who conform to binary gender.

Identification 
The Commissioner of the Department of Registrations of Persons, under the UPFA, stated that they will be providing new ID with a new number for transgender persons.

Social issues

Financial Issues 
A significant section of the third gendered community are forced to do sex work or beg for money as a result of being rejected by their biological parents. A disproportionate number of the community lack formal education and are unable to find jobs.

A third gendered person explained, "“It’s very hard, in reality. It’s quite alright for the posher Colombo 07 people; they can be doctors and lawyers and such. The poorer people have it harder and are often mistreated, which is why they leave their families or live a life of secrecy. It’s also really hard to find work thanks to societal perceptions, which again is why you get many trans people who are engaged in sex work or who are dancers,”.

A number of transgender people complain about the high cost of undertaking conversion to their desired gender, in-part because government funded facilities are generally of poorer quality and that a lack of trained staff exist on the island.It has been thought that a number of transgender people are forced to work as sex worked in order to earn money for themselves, though they face the risk of being arrested as prostitution is illegal on the island

Health 
The third gendered community often face discrimination from health workers on the island, and can find it hard to change their gender even if legally entitled to.

Feminism 
A complaint about the treatment of third gender in Sri Lanka states that the gender disparity between men and women in employment shows how hard it is for third gendered to gain employment.

See also 
Sexual Minorities in Sri Lanka
Tamil Sexual Minorities

References 

LGBT in Sri Lanka
Gender in Sri Lanka
Third gender